Brian Anthony D'Ambrosio is an American journalist and author best known for his interview-based books about Montana subjects.

Biography

D'Ambrosio was born in New York and grew up in Yonkers. After finishing high school he went to work for a Lake Placid newspaper. He later completed a degree in public relations and journalism at SUNY Plattsburgh. In 2000, he moved to Missoula, Montana, where he worked for a local newspaper. In 2008, amidst the decline of newspapers, he moved to Wisconsin, where he struggled with journalism for several years before returning to Montana.

D'Ambrosio spent two and a half years researching the late Charles Bronson for the biography Menacing Face Worth Millions: A Life of Charles Bronson. He scoured newspaper and cinema magazine archives, and interviewed Bronson's first wife, Harriet; other family members; former cast and crew members; and residents of Ehrenfeld, Pennsylvania, Bronson's hometown. The book was published in 2012 by Jabberwocky Press, a small Western Pennsylvania publisher.

His books published in 2013 include a free ebook detailing the innocence of the later exonerated Ryan W. Ferguson. According to KRCG Television in Columbia, Missouri, D'Ambrosio wrote the book about the Ferguson case with the help of Ryan's father Bill. Free Ryan Ferguson: 101 Reasons Why Ryan Should Be Released has interviews, maps and pictures he said supports Ferguson's innocence.

D'Ambrosio interviewed some of the NHL's most noted fighters, 30 subjects total, in Warriors on the Ice: Hockey's Toughest Talk. According to one review, "But while there are collective similarities in the past, the book gives readers a fascinating look at where those tough guys are today. It's a group in which some fall into the stereotypical mold, others restore and repurpose old chandeliers and antiques, and still others now hold PhDs."

"I think I just wanted to connect with these guys and share some of their pride and dignity, and let people know the guys that did it and continue to do it may not be doing it for the reasons you expect", D'Ambrosio said. "I think a lot of people who don't follow hockey will find it interesting. And it's always fun getting into the psyche of who we are, what we do and why we do it."

His most recent books include Warrior in the Ring, The Life of World Champion Native Boxer Marvin Camel, which was a High Plains Award finalist. The book brings to life the story and struggle of forgotten boxer Marvin Camel, a half-black, half-Indian pinball mechanic who became the first cruiserweight titlist. According to Indian Country Todays review, Marvin Camel's first championship was won while fighting for the World Boxing Council World Cruiserweight Title, in a rematch against Croatian fighter Mate Parlov in 1980. Camel held the title only until the next fight later that year. His second championship tenure came in 1983 under the auspices of the International Boxing Federation World Cruiserweight Title, winning against Canadian Rocky MacDonald in Nova Scotia. That title was held until 1984, but Camel lost in his first defense of it in Montana.

Other books include Rasta in the Ring: The Life of Rastafarian Boxer Livingstone Bramble; Shot in Montana: A History of Big Sky Cinema, which includes the locations and behind the scenes interviews of 93 movies made in Montana, including the financially disastrous Heaven's Gate and Thunderbolt and Lightfoot; and Montana and the NFL, which includes interviews and profiles of Montana-born or Montana-connected football players such as Pat Donovan, Mike Tilleman, and Jerry Kramer.

According to the December 2019 House of Mystery Radio program, D'Ambrosio works as a private investigator and true crime journalist in Montana and Kansas.

Published works

References

External links
 

21st-century American non-fiction writers
American male journalists
People from Yonkers, New York
State University of New York at Plattsburgh alumni
Year of birth missing (living people)
Living people
People from Missoula, Montana
Journalists from Montana
Journalists from New York (state)
21st-century American male writers